La princesa de Éboli is a two-part Spanish period drama television miniseries about the woman of the same name. Directed by Belén Macías and starring Belén Rueda, Hugo Silva and Eduard Fernández, it originally aired in October 2010 on Antena 3.

Plot 
Developed from a "feminist" point of view, the plot concerns the developments on the biography of Ana de Mendoza, Princess of Éboli—a central figure in the Court of Philip II—after she widowed, when she lived a love story with Antonio Pérez, secretary of the king. The fiction delves on the intrigues taking place in the court, including the Pérez's betrayal on the King or the assassination of Juan de Escobedo, that lead to the imprisonment and fall from grace of Ana de Mendoza.

Cast

Production and release 

La princesa de Éboli was produced by Atresmedia Cine and Notro Televisión. Filming began by April 2010 and was wrapped by May 2010. Shooting locations included the Ducal Palace of Pastrana; the castle of Mendoza in Manzanares el Real, the Monastery of San Lorenzo de El Escorial and La Granjilla de La Fresneda. Belén Macías directed the miniseries whereas María Jaén worked as screenwriter.

During the film, Belén Rueda wore the eye patch characteristic of her character on her left eye instead of the right eye, which is the one that the Princess of Éboli actually covered.

The miniseries premiered on 18 October 2010, with 2,844,000 viewers and a 16.4% audience share. The finale aired on 20 October 2010, commanding 2,412,000 viewers and a 14.3% share.

References 

Spanish television miniseries
Television shows filmed in Spain
Television series set in the 16th century
Spanish biographical television series
2010 Spanish television series debuts
2010 Spanish television series endings
2010s Spanish drama television series
Antena 3 (Spanish TV channel) network series
Cultural depictions of Ana de Mendoza y de Silva, Princess of Éboli